Leptodactylus fragilis, known under many common names such as the Mexican white-lipped frog, American white-lipped frog or simply white-lipped frog, is a species of leptodactylid frog. Its distribution ranges from the Lower Rio Grande Valley of Texas in the United States south through Mexico and Central America to Colombia and Venezuela. It is often—wrongly—referred to as Leptodactylus labialis (Cope, 1878) (or Leptodactylus mystaceus labialis Shreve, 1957), which is a junior synonym of Leptodactylus mystacinus.

Description 

Mexican white-lipped frogs are grey-brown in color with brown or black mottling. They have a distinctive white stripe along their upper lip which gives them their name.

Habitat 
Mexican white-lipped frog is a widespread and common species found in a range of habitats, in savanna, grassland, semi-arid lands, and open habitats in humid and dry, lowland and montane tropical forests. It is often seen near water.

Behavior and reproduction
Mexican white-lipped frogs are nocturnal and carnivorous. During the heat of the day, they bury themselves in loose soil of roadside ditches, irrigated cropland, or grasslands, and emerge to feed in the evenings.

References

External links 

fragilis
Frogs of North America
Frogs of South America
Amphibians of Central America
Amphibians of Belize
Amphibians of Colombia
Amphibians of Costa Rica
Amphibians of El Salvador
Amphibians of Guatemala
Amphibians of Honduras
Amphibians of Mexico
Amphibians of Nicaragua
Amphibians of Panama
Amphibians of the United States
Fauna of the Rio Grande valleys
Amphibians of Venezuela
Amphibians described in 1877
Taxa named by Paul Brocchi